The 15653 / 54 Guwahati–Jammu Tawi Amarnath Express is an Express train belonging to Indian Railways - Northeast Frontier Railway zone that runs between Guwahati and Jammu Tawi in India.

It operates as train number 15653 from Guwahati to Jammu Tawi  and as train number 15654 in the reverse direction serving the 8 states of Assam, West Bengal, Bihar, Uttar Pradesh, Uttarakhand, Haryana, Punjab and Jammu and Kashmir.

It is named after the Amarnath Temple which is located in the union territory of Jammu and Kashmir and is 1 of 3 trains that connect Guwahati and Jammu Tawi, the other being the Lohit Express and Kamakhya–Shri Mata Vaishno Devi Katra Express.

Coaches

The 15653 / 54 Guwahati Jammu Tawi Amarnath Express has 1 AC 2 tier, 2 AC 3 tier, 14 Sleeper Class, 4 General Unreserved & 2 SLR (Seating cum Luggage Rake) Coaches. In addition, it carries a Pantry car coach.
 
As is customary with most train services in India, Coach Composition may be amended at the discretion of Indian Railways depending on demand.

Service

Routeing

The 15653 / 54 Guwahati Jammu Tawi Amarnath Express runs from:

ASSAM 
Guwahati (Starts)

WEST BENGAL
New Alipurduar
New Cooch Behar
Dhupguri
New Jalpaiguri (Siliguri)

BIHAR
Katihar Junction
Begusarai
Barauni Junction
Muzaffarpur Junction
Bapudam Motihari

UTTAR PRADESH
Gorakhpur Junction 
Basti 
Babhnan 
Gonda
Lucknow NR
Shahjehanpur
Bareilly

Saharanpur Junction

UTTARAKHAND
Laksar Junction

HARYANA

Ambala Cantonment Junction

PUNJAB
Ludhiana Junction 

JAMMU KASHMIR 

Jammu Tawi (Ends).

Traction

Operation

15653 Guwahati Jammu Tawi Amarnath Express runs from Guwahati every Wednesday reaching Jammu Tawi on the 3rd day.

15654 Jammu Tawi Guwahati Amarnath Express runs from Jammu Tawi every Friday reaching Guwahati on the 3rd day.

References 

 http://etrain.info/in?TRAIN=15653

External links

Named passenger trains of India
Rail transport in Assam
Rail transport in West Bengal
Rail transport in Bihar
Rail transport in Uttar Pradesh
Rail transport in Uttarakhand
Rail transport in Haryana
Rail transport in Punjab, India
Rail transport in Jammu and Kashmir
Transport in Guwahati
Transport in Jammu